Mikuláš of Hus (died 24 December 1420) was a Bohemian politician and leading representative of the Hussite movement. He died unexpectedly on 24 December 1420, leaving the position of first captain of the Taborites open to Jan Žižka.

References

Czech politicians
Hussite people
1420 deaths
Year of birth unknown
Czech military leaders
People of the Hussite Wars